Centurion University of Technology and Management is a multi-sector, private state university from Odisha, India. With its main campus earlier at Parlakhemundi in the Gajapati  and another constituent campus located at Jatni, on the fringes of Bhubaneswar,which is now as main campus & it was accorded the status of a university in the year 2010. The university has been accredited by NAAC with 'A' Grade, thereby becoming the youngest private university to have earned the distinction. In 2016, the Bhubaneswar campus of the university was ranked 81 among the institutions offering engineering education in India by the Ministry of Human Resource Development, Government of India under the NIRF.

The university offers under-graduate, post-graduate and doctoral courses in the fields of engineering & technology, agricultural sciences, architecture planning and design, mining, teachers' education, media and communication, paramedics and allied Health Sciences, pharmacy and life sciences, management, applied sciences and a number of vocational trades in its two major campuses. It also has regional campuses at Balangir, Rayagada and Chhatrapur.

History
The main campus of the university at Paralakhemundi was known previously as Jagannath Institute for Technology and Management (JITM), this was established in 1997. The institute was affiliated to Berhampur University, Berhampur till 2003 and Biju Patnaik University of Technology, Rourkela until 2010. The institute was taken over by a group of academicians led by Dr. Mukti Kanta Mishra and Prof. D.N. Rao in the year 2005. In 2008, a second campus, Centurion Institute of Technology, was opened at Bhubaneswar. Subsequently, JITM was transformed into Centurion University of Technology and Management in August 2010, through an act of Odisha Legislative Assembly.

References

External links
Official website

Universities in Odisha
Educational institutions established in 2010
2010 establishments in Orissa